The 1893 Rutgers Queensmen football team represented Rutgers University as an independent during the 1893 college football season. The Queensmen compiled a 0–4 record and were outscored by their opponents 88 to 8. The team had no coach, and its captains were Chalmers P. Van Dyke, Gabe Ludlow, and George Ludlow.

Schedule

References

Rutgers
Rutgers Scarlet Knights football seasons
College football winless seasons
Rutgers Queensmen football